Leinster Rugby is one of the four professional provincial club rugby union teams from the island of Ireland and the most successful Irish team domestically. They compete in the United Rugby Championship and the European Rugby Champions Cup.

Leinster play their home games primarily at the RDS Arena, although larger games are played in the Aviva Stadium when the capacity of the RDS is insufficient. Before moving to the RDS in 2005, Leinster's traditional home ground was Donnybrook Stadium, in Dublin 4. The province plays primarily in blue with white or yellow trim and the team crest features a harp within a rugby ball, the harp being an ancient symbol of the province found in and taken from the flag of Leinster, although the traditional colours of Leinster Rugby mean the design more resembles the flag of the President of Ireland or the Coat of arms of Ireland.

Leinster turned professional along with its fellow Irish provinces in 1995 and has competed in the United Rugby Championship (formerly known as the Celtic League, Magners League and the Pro12 / Pro14) since it was founded in 2001, having previously competed in the annual Irish interprovincial championship.

History

Founding (1879–1899)
The Leinster Branch was inaugurated at a meeting on 31 October 1879. The meeting was held at Lawrence's premises at 63 Grafton Street and was largely attended. Although this was the formal founding of Leinster as we know it today, with the amalgamation of the Irish Football Union and the Northern Union, the Leinster provincial team had been active since 1879 – when the first interprovincial derby was played against Ulster. The Leinster and Ulster teams also made up the representative Irish team that competed against England in Ireland's first-ever international in 1875. Upon the founding of the union, Munster were also added to the fray in 1879, when their first provincial team was selected and first Munster players represented Ireland.

F. Kennedy (Wanderers) was elected first Hon. Secretary of the Branch and C.B. Croker (Lansdowne) first Hon. Treasurer.

The function of the Branch was to organise the game of rugby football in the province. Every year five representatives would be selected to join the IRFU Committee. They would be known was the "Leinster Five" and would pick the Leinster representative teams.

The first Interprovincial matches between Leinster, Ulster and Munster were held in 1875. At this time the matches were played with 20 players a side. Leinster lost to Ulster by a converted try and beat Munster by one goal to nil. Since then there has been a match between these teams annually, with Connacht joining the fold in 1885.

Leinster Schools Interprovincial matches have been taking place since 1888. Leinster Schools beat the Ulster Schools in Belfast on Saturday 7 April by a dropped goal to a try. Their first match against Munster Schools took place on 18 March 1899, when Leinster won by two tries to one.

Amateur period (1900–1990s)
The early 1920s led to the creation of the Provincial Towns Cup and the Metropolitan Cup, which are still hard-fought competitions in the Leinster Rugby calendar. Much has changed in rugby over the years, but the original idea of Leinster Club Rugby acting as a feeder for the Leinster Interprovincial side, though now professional, still stands true.

All Interprovincial matches were abandoned during the years of the Great War (1914–1918) and the War period (1939–1945), though unofficial matches were played.

The first major touring side to play Leinster was a team drawn from the New Zealand Army – the Kiwis, in 1946. Although it was not an official touring side organised by the New Zealand Rugby Union, the quality of the match, which was drawn 10 points each, is still remembered to this day.

The first official overseas touring side that came to play Leinster was an Australian touring side in 1957. Since then, Leinster has played against every major touring side from Fiji to France.

Before the days of professional rugby union, there was further emphasis on Irish club rugby as opposed to the provincial game. During these times the provincial sides were purely representative sides and games were far less frequent than now. Between 1946 and 2002 the sides would meet annually to contest the Irish Interprovincial Championship and on rare occasions would be tested against touring international sides. When rugby union was declared 'open' in 1995, these four teams became the four professional teams run by the Irish Rugby Football Union and therefore much of the history of the side has been made in the modern era.

Leinster Lions (1990s–2005)
Leinster became a professional outfit in the mid-1990s. The "Leinster Lions" name came into existence during the 2001–02 season as the result of a joint marketing initiative between Leinster Rugby and its kit sponsors, the Canterbury Clothing Company. Before the start of the 2004–05 season, the 'Lions' was dropped from the name. It is still used for marketing and branding, in particular, the Cubs Club for Junior members of Leinster Rugby. The Leinster mascot is "Leo the Lion". It was also during this time that the song “Molly Malone” became a match fixture to be sung by the fans.

Leinster's first season in the newly formed Celtic League ended in success as the Lions were crowned the inaugural champions, beating rivals Munster Rugby in the 2001–02 final. In 2002–03, they became only the third team in the history of the European Cup to win all their games in pool play. They also went one step further in the playoffs than the previous season by reaching the semi-finals (for the first time since 1995–96), but lost at home against French side Perpignan, which was accompanied by an unsuccessful season in the Celtic League. The 2003–04 season also ended in disappointment as Leinster slumped to their worst ever league performance and failed to qualify from their European Cup group.

Title misses (2004–2007)
Leinster improved during the 2004–05 season, finishing 3rd, just three points behind the eventual winners, the Ospreys. Leinster also won all of their pool games in that year's European Cup, and were again among the favourites for the title, however they went out at the quarter final stage to Leicester Tigers.

The next two seasons of the Celtic League were to end in near misses for Leinster, as they lost out on the 2005–06 and 2006–07 league titles on the final day of the season. These seasons also saw progress in the European Cup. In 2005–06, Leinster progressed to the semi-final but were eliminated by Irish rivals Munster at Lansdowne Road and they reached the quarter-final the following year where they were beaten by eventual winners London Wasps.

European and domestic dominance (2008–2014) 
Increasing attendances at Leinster games led to a move across Dublin 4 from Donnybrook Stadium to the redeveloped RDS Arena.

In 2007–08, Leinster failed to qualify from their European Cup pool, but did end the season as Celtic League champions, sealing the title with a 41–8 victory over the Newport Gwent Dragons in front of their home fans at the RDS.

In the 2008–09 season, Leinster topped their European Cup pool despite away losses to French side Castres and English side Wasps. Victory over Harlequins in the quarter-finals followed, despite the Bloodgate Scandal. Leinster overcame Munster 25–6 in a semi-final in Dublin's Croke Park that broke the world record attendance for a "club" rugby union game with a crowd of over 82,200. Leinster won the 2009 European Cup Final in Murrayfield Stadium in Edinburgh, beating Leicester Tigers 19–16 to claim their first European crown.

In 2009–10 Leinster was eliminated from the European Cup at the semi-final stage by eventual winners Toulouse. Also despite having topped the Pro12 league during the regular season, Leinster lost the first-ever Play-off Final 17–12 on their home ground to the Ospreys.

In the 2010–11 European Cup, Leinster defeated the top English teams (Leicester Tigers, Saracens & Northampton Saints), as well as top French sides, Toulouse (who were the defending European champions), Racing Metro & Clermont Auvergne, (the French Champions). to go on to regain their title as champions of Europe in the 2011 European Cup Final at the Millennium Stadium in Cardiff. Trailing at half time, Leinster scored 27 unanswered points in the second half to beat Northampton 33–22 and claim their second European crown with the biggest comeback in European Cup final history.
Leinster were also chasing a Pro12 & European Cup double, but lost 19–9 to Irish rivals Munster in the Pro12 Final.

In 2011–12 Leinster became only the second side ever to retain the title of European Champions. Leinster emerged unbeaten in group play to top their group and went on to defeat the Cardiff Blues 34–3 in the quarterfinals, followed by a 19–15 semifinal victory over ASM Clermont Auvergne. and defeated Ulster in the first all-Irish final 42–14, recording the most points scored and the most tries scored in a European Cup final as well as becoming the first unbeaten side to win the European Cup.
Once again, Leinster targeted the double, and faced a repeat of the 2010 Pro12 final against the Ospreys. Leinster's domestic title challenge fell at the final hurdle, conceding a final minute try to slump to a one-point defeat, and unable to complete the double despite topping the table in the regular season.

The 2012–13 campaign proved to be another successful season for Leinster Rugby.  The club finished in second place during the regular season of the Pro12 and defeated Glasgow Warriors by a score of 17–15 in their semi-final play-off match on 11 May 2013. On 17 May, Leinster were crowned champions of the European Challenge Cup after defeating Stade Français 34–13 in the final at their home ground, the RDS Arena. Leinster successfully completed the double on 25 May, defeating Ulster 24–18 in the Pro12 final to claim their third league championship.

Leinster continued their success in the 2013–14 season by becoming the first team ever to defend the Pro12 title, topping the league in the regular season and defeating Glasgow Warriors 34–12 in their fifth consecutive Pro12 play-off final and also secured their seventh major title in as many years.

Blooding a new generation (2015–2017) 
Following a remarkable run of seven major trophies in seven years, Leinster's title run came to an end following the 2013–14 season. The 2014–15 season saw a dip in form, with Leinster finishing in fifth place in the league and failing to make the play-offs. Fortunes in the newly formed Champions Cup were better, with the team reaching the semi-final where they were defeated in extra-time by eventual winners, Toulon. At the end of the season, Head Coach, Matt O'Connor, left the club by mutual consent with former club captain, Leo Cullen, being named as his replacement. Cullen then brought in ex-England coach Stuart Lancaster as senior coach at the start of the 2016–17 season, which saw a huge improvement from Leinster as well a big group of young players coming through. Despite playing brilliant rugby all season, Leinster failed to win any silverware, falling short in the Champions Cup semi-final to old rivals Clermont and shocked by the Scarlets in the Pro12 Semi-Final at the RDS. However, there was huge optimism amongst the players and supporters as they believed this was only the start of a new generation and perhaps another era of success.

Return to success (2018–present) 
Starting with the 2017-18 season, Leinster won four straight Pro14 championships. In Europe, they won the 2017-18 Heineken Cup, defeating Racing 92 by a score of 15–12 in the final in Bilbao. They were runners-up in the 2018-19 final, losing 20–10 to Saracens F.C. Leinster were knocked out of the Heineken cup competition in the quarter-finals in 2019-20, and again at the semi-finals stage in 2020-21.

The format of the 2021-22 competition was affected by the COVID-19 pandemic. Leinster won their first round matchup with Bath. However, the day prior to Leinster's second match, an away fixture to Montpellier, the EPCR announced that the match would not go ahead, and instead awarded a 28–0 win to Montpellier. This was despite Leinster having a full squad certified to be COVID-free, named, and ready to travel. The following day, the EPCR announced that all other matches involving French and UK teams from the same second round would be postponed to a future date. Following the EPCR’s decision to award Montpellier a 28–0 bonus-point win for their cancelled round two clash, Leinster beat Montpellier by 89–7, with the 82 point margin eclipsing their previous biggest win in Europe set against Bourgoin back in 2004.

Previous season summaries

Gold background denotes championsSilver background denotes runner-up

* After dropping into the competition from the Champions Cup/Heineken Cup

Heineken Cup / Champions Cup

Challenge Cup

United Rugby Championship

Current standings

United Rugby Championship

European Rugby Champions Cup
Pool A

Honours

Colours and crest

The current crest was introduced in 2005 as Leinster Rugby held no copyright on the previous crest. The new, stylised crest, is made specific to Leinster Rugby as it incorporates the harp with a rugby ball. The Leinster Rugby crest is on all official club merchandise including replica jerseys.

The province's current kit (2018/19) is blue with a pattern of spearheads on the jersey which takes inspiration from the people of Laighean (the ancient Irish name for Leinster), while the alternative kit is green with gold features, the colours seen in the Flag of Leinster, with a pattern of geographical cutouts for its 12 counties. The European kit is 'night navy' with the name of each of the 12 counties visible on the jersey written in the ancient Irish alphabet ogham.

The Leinster jersey also features four stars above the crest, to represent the four European Cup titles won to date.

Stadia

RDS Arena

Leinster's current home ground is the RDS Arena. Games were first played at the RDS during the 2006–07 season, initially just for European Cup games. By the following season, however, all games had been moved to the RDS. The RDS has undergone large scale redevelopment since Leinster moved in. The arena now has a mostly seated capacity of 18,500. As the RDS remains a showjumping venue, the North and South stands are removable. A roof has been constructed to cover the grandstand opposite the pre-existing Anglesea stand. The RDS will be Leinster's home until 2027, as a 20-year lease was signed in 2007.

In July 2014, it was announced by the RDS and Leinster rugby that a design competition was being held to develop the arena into a 25,000 capacity world-class stadium, with work expected to commence on the redevelopment in April 2016. The selling of naming rights to the arena will be a key component in funding the project, with an initial budget of €20,000,000 being proposed.

Aviva Stadium

For bigger games where the RDS does not have sufficient capacity, Leinster play their games at the Aviva Stadium, which has an all-seater capacity of 51,700. These are often key home games in the European Cup or United Rugby Championship games against domestic rivals. In 2010 they first played a home league game against Munster, the first time the stadium sold out, and then against ASM Clermont Auvergne. Leinster defeated Leicester Tigers at the venue in the 2010–11 European Cup quarter-finals and went on to beat Toulouse in the semi-finals, also held at the Aviva stadium on 30 April 2011, en route to winning their second European Cup. The following season Leinster hosted Munster, Bath and Cardiff at the Aviva Stadium and remained unbeaten at the ground until December 2012 when they lost 21–28 to ASM Clermont Auvergne.

Donnybrook Stadium

Leinster's traditional home over the years has been Donnybrook Stadium in Donnybrook, Dublin 4. Donnybrook consists of a single covered stand and three sides of open terracing. A move across Dublin 4 to the RDS Arena for Leinster was needed to accommodate growing crowds, as the 6,000 capacity stadium had become too small. For this reason, Leinster have signed a long-term lease with the Royal Dublin Society to play home games at the RDS Arena. Donnybrook has since, been improved as a venue with the reconstruction of the grandstand in 2008 and remains an important venue for rugby union in Dublin. Due to limited space, it is unlikely that Donnybrook will undergo further redevelopment. Leinster A play their British and Irish Cup games in the stadium and the senior team have continued to hold certain pre-season friendlies in the stadium as well as most Leinster schools cup matches being held at the venue.

Supporters
Before the advent of professionalism in the Irish game, provincial rugby games were generally poorly attended. During most of the 1990s, Leinster matches regularly attracted crowds of about 500 to 2,000. The decision to structure the game professionally via the provincial network through centralised player contracts and the subsequent on-field success achieved by Leinster and the other provinces resulted in a significant increase in support within a decade. Leinster had 3,700 season ticket holders in 2006, double the number of the previous season. The Official Leinster Supporters Club was formally established as a club in 2007. The last match at the old Lansdowne Road stadium was against Ulster on 31 December 2006 before it was demolished to make way for the new Aviva Stadium, earning the match the moniker of "The Last Stand". Leinster won the match 20–12, with an attendance of 48,000 – a record at the time. A previous attendance record in the Pro12 was also set at Lansdowne Road, for a game between Leinster and Munster which drew a crowd of 30,000. Leinster's supporters were named as 'Player of the Month' for April 2009 following their support in the European Cup Quarter Final against Harlequins at The Stoop.

On several occasions Leinster have set the record for the largest Celtic league and Pro12 attendances. On 2 October 2010, Leinster beat Munster 13–9 in the 5th round of the league at the Aviva Stadium. This set a new crowd attendance record for a Pro12 game at 50,645. They subsequently set a new record on 29 March 2014 during a sellout match against Munster in which 51,700 fans were in attendance. This Pro12 record was subsequently surpassed by attendances at the Judgement Day fixtures. During the 2014–15 Pro12 season Leinster had the best support of any club in the PRO12 league with an average attendance of 17,717.

Leinster's European Cup clash against Munster at Croke Park on 2 May 2009 set a world record attendance at the time for a club rugby union game with a crowd of 82,208.

Home Attendance

Up to date as of the 2021–22 season.

Leinster A

Leinster A is the team that represents Leinster in the British & Irish Cup, having won the competition a record two times to date, in the 2012–13 season as well as the 2013–14 season, also becoming the first and only side to ever successfully defend the trophy. Leinster A also compete in the All Ireland Inter-provincial Championship.  Pre-professionalism and a formal Celtic league structure, the main Leinster team competed in the AIIPC. Since the advent of professionalism, the provinces have fielded lesser teams to concentrate on the Celtic League.  The team is composed of Senior Leinster squad players requiring game time, Development contract & Academy players and, occasionally, AIL players called up from their clubs.

For the 2019–20 season, the Leinster A team is coached by Noel McNamara.

Updated as of 12 April 2021.

Sponsorship
From the 2007–08 season to the 2017–18 season Leinster's kits were supplied by Canterbury of New Zealand but for the next five seasons starting with the 2018 -19 season Leinster's kits will be supplied by Adidas. Bank of Ireland, the country's oldest banking institution are Leinster's primary sponsors appearing in the front of their shirt, their sleeves, the top back of their shirt and the front right of their shorts. The Bank of Ireland symbol appeared on Leinster's front right and front left collars. On occasion, the team will wear a shirt adorned with the logo of another sponsor due to a promotion run annually by the bank offering up the sponsorship space to an Irish business by way of a competition to win the right to become a sponsor for a day. During the 2013–14 season the contest was won by Dublin-based meat wholesaler Gahan Meats and for 2014–15 the shirt sponsorship winners were accounting software provider Big Red Cloud. The sponsorship prize package is valued at €50,000 and attracts hundreds of companies keen to be shortlisted each year. The left of Leinster's back shorts had Bank of Ireland between 2009 and 2013 where it was replaced by Bank of Ireland's Twitter address right up until 2015 where it was replaced by Laya Healthcare. The teams 'official airline' is Irelands' CityJet.

Management and coaches

Current squad

Academy squad

Results versus representative sides
Scores and results list Leinster's points tally first.

Records against European Cup and URC opponents in the professional era (1995–present)

Correct as of 04 March 2023.

Since the inception of the Celtic league, Leinster have dominated their Irish provincial rivals Ulster, with a 38–10 win–loss record. Similarly, Leinster enjoy a 34–9 win–loss ratio against western province Connacht. Leinster also hold a 33–17 head-to-head advantage against arch-rivals Munster, in one of the most intense derbies in world rugby. Of the United Rugby Championship sides, Munster have the most competitive record against Leinster; all of the league's other sides have substantial losing records against Leinster. The Welsh side, Celtic Warriors competed in the Celtic league during the first couple of seasons and have a winning record against Leinster of two wins and zero defeats.

Among European teams, of those who have played at least three games against Leinster, only two enjoy a winning record. Stade Francais lead Leinster 3–2, while RC Toulon have a commanding 4–0 head-to-head lead. These are the only European clubs who have played against Leinster at least three times who have a winning record against them.

Notable players 
See also .

Club captains
Professional era only

British & Irish Lions 
The following Leinster players have also represented the British & Irish Lions. Bold indicates tour captain.

Notable overseas players
The following is a list of non-Irish qualified representative Leinster players:

Head coaches (professional era)

Personnel honours and records

(correct as of 04 March 2023)

Bold indicates active player

World Rugby Player of the Year
Inaugurated 2001

World Rugby Breakthrough Player of the Year

Inaugurated 2015

Nominated (3 nominees per year)

World Rugby Junior Player of the Year

Inaugurated 2008 - awarded to World Rugby Under 20 Championship player of the tournament

Europe
All players listed below are Irish unless otherwise noted.

ERC European Dream Team 
The following Leinster players were selected in the ERC European Dream Team, an all-time dream team of Heineken Cup players over the first 15 years of professional European rugby. (1995–2010). Both O'Driscoll and Elsom were part of the 2008–09 Heineken Cup winning team.

* Elsom had the fewest Heineken Cup appearances in the team and was the only member born outside of Europe

European Player of the Year

Awarded annually since 2010-11

European Cup Team of the Year 
The following Leinster players were selected on the European Cup team of the year.

All players listed below are Irish unless otherwise noted. Inaugurated 2020-21. 

Rugby Champions Cup player records

Statistics do not include European Rugby Challenge Cup matches. Updated as of 21 January 2023.

Rugby Champions Cup Individual Season Records

The players listed above were the top try-scorers and points-scorers for the European Rugby Champions Cup in a given season.

United Rugby Championship
All players listed below are Irish unless otherwise noted. Inaugurated 2006-07. 

United Rugby Championship Team of the Year 
The following Leinster players were selected on the Pro 14 team of the year.

United Rugby Championship Player Records

Updated 04 March 2023

United Rugby Championship Golden Boot 
The Golden Boot is awarded to the kicker who has successfully converted the highest percentage of place kicks during the 22-week regular Pro12 season. To be eligible, the player must have taken at least 20 kicks at goal. The prize has been awarded annually since 2012.
(Percentage success rate in brackets)

United Rugby Championship Individual Awards

United Rugby Championship Team Awards
 2010–11:  Fairplay Award 
 2011–12:  Fairplay Award

End-of-season club awards

See also
 Rugby union in Ireland
 History of rugby union matches between Leinster and Connacht
 History of rugby union matches between Leinster and Munster
 History of rugby union matches between Leinster and Ulster

Notes

References

External links
 Official site
 Leinster Supporters Site and Forum
 Leinster Rugby feature on The Irish Times
 Unofficial Leinster Calendar & Results

 
 
Rugby clubs established in 1875
Rugby union governing bodies in Ireland
Rug
Heineken Cup champions
United Rugby Championship teams
1875 establishments in Ireland